A penumbral lunar eclipse will take place on Monday, March 25, 2024. It will be visible to the naked eye as 95.57% of the Moon will be immersed in Earth's penumbral shadow.

Visibility 
It will be fully visible from most of the Americas, will be seen rising over Australia and eastern Asia, and setting over western parts of Africa and Europe.

Related eclipses

Eclipses of 2024 
 A penumbral lunar eclipse on 25 March.
 A total solar eclipse on 8 April.
 A partial lunar eclipse on 18 September.
 An annular solar eclipse on 2 October.

Lunar year series

Saros series 

It is part of Saros cycle 113.

Half-Saros cycle
A lunar eclipse will be preceded and followed by solar eclipses by 9 years and 5.5 days (a half saros). This lunar eclipse is related to two total solar eclipses of Solar Saros 120.

Tritos series 
 Preceded: Lunar eclipse of April 25, 2013
 Followed: Lunar eclipse of February 22, 2035

Tzolkinex 
 Preceded: Lunar eclipse of February 11, 2017
 Followed: Lunar eclipse of May 7, 2031

See also 
List of lunar eclipses and List of 21st-century lunar eclipses

References

External links 
 Saros cycle 113
 

2024-03
2024-03
2024 in science